The Woman He Married is a 1922 American silent drama film directed by Fred Niblo. The film is considered to be lost.

Plot
As reviewed in a film magazine, a rich man's son marries an artist's model, and is then disinherited by his father. Despite their circumstances, both the son and his model wife do well.

Cast
 Anita Stewart as Natalie Lane
 Darrell Foss as Roderick Warren
 Donald MacDonald as Byrne Travers
 William Conklin as Andrew Warren
 Shannon Day as Mimi
 Charlotte Pierce as Muriel Warren
 Charles Belcher as Richard Steel
 Frank Tokunaga as Yosi (as Frank Tokawaja)

References

External links

1922 films
1922 drama films
Silent American drama films
American silent feature films
American black-and-white films
Films directed by Fred Niblo
Films produced by Louis B. Mayer
Films with screenplays by Bess Meredyth
First National Pictures films
Lost American films
1922 lost films
Lost drama films
1920s American films